Gerhardus "Gert" Cornelius Oosthuizen (born 10 May 1957) is the current Deputy Minister of Sport and Recreation (since 10 May 2004) in South Africa.

See also

African Commission on Human and Peoples' Rights
Constitution of South Africa
History of the African National Congress
Politics in South Africa
Provincial governments of South Africa

References

Living people
1957 births
Afrikaner people
Government ministers of South Africa